Antigona Hyska (born 23 June 2003) is an Albanian footballer who plays as a goalkeeper for Women's National Championship club FK Apolonia Fier and the Albania women's national team.

See also
List of Albania women's international footballers

References

2003 births
Living people
Albanian women's footballers
Women's association football goalkeepers
Albania women's international footballers
FK Apolonia Fier (women) players
Sportspeople from Lushnjë